Sabri is a male given name of Arabic origin, it may refer to:

Given name
 Sabri Çakır (born 1955), Turkish poet
 Sabri Gurses (born 1972), Turkish writer
 Sabri Jiryis (born 1938), Arab-Israeli writer
 Sabri Kalic (born 1966), Turkish film director
 Sabri Khan (1927–2015), Indian musician
 Sabri Lamouchi, French footballer
 Sabri Ali (born 1993), Morocco footballer
 Sabri Sarıoğlu (born 1984), Turkish footballer

Surname
 Ali Sabri (1920–1991), Egyptian politician
 Hend Sabri, Tunisian actress
 Masud Sabri, Uyghur Governor of Xinjiang
 Mostafa Sabri (born 1984), Iranian footballer
 Naji Sabri, Iraqi politician
 Nazli Sabri (1894–1978), Queen consort of Egypt
 Osman Sabri (1905–1993), Kurdish politically active poet
 Rais Anis Sabri, Indian qawwali singer
 Shaarib Sabri (born 1988), Indian singer and composer, brother of Toshi
 Shabab Sabri (born 1979), Indian singer
 Toshi Sabri (born 1984), Indian singer and composer
 Yasmine Sabri (born 1987), Egyptian actress
 Sabri Brothers, Pakistani qawwali singers, including Ghulam Farid Sabri and Maqbool Ahmed Sabri
 Amjad Sabri, Ghulam Farid's son

See also 
 Sabri, Iran, a village in the Razavi Khorasan province of Iran
 Chishti Sabri, Sufi sub order of the Chishti Order
 Alauddin Sabir Kaliyari, Indian Sufi saint, founder of the order

Arabic given names
Arabic-language surnames